The 2017–18 Northern Counties East Football League season was the 36th in the history of Northern Counties East Football League, a football competition in England.

Premier Division

The Premier Division featured 19 clubs which competed in the previous season, along with three new clubs, promoted from Division One:
 Hall Road Rangers
 Penistone Church
 Pontefract Collieries

League table

Stadia and locations

Division One

Division One featured 17 clubs which competed in the previous season, along with five new clubs.
Clubs relegated from the Premier Division:
Armthorpe Welfare
Retford United
Plus:
FC Bolsover, promoted from the Central Midlands League
East Yorkshire Carnegie, promoted from the Humber Premier League
Swallownest, promoted from the Sheffield & Hallamshire County Senior League

League table

Play-offs

Semi-finals

Final

Stadia and locations

League Cup

The 2017–18 Northern Counties East Football League League Cup was the 36th season of the league cup competition of the Northern Counties East Football League.

First round

Second round

Third round

Fourth round

Quarter-finals

Semi-finals

Final

References

External links
 Northern Counties East Football League

2017–18
9